Pleuraspidotherium is an extinct genus of condylarth of the family Pleuraspidotheriidae, whose fossils have been found in the Late Paleocene Marnes de Montchenot of France and the Tremp Formation of modern Spain.

References 

Condylarths
Thanetian life
Paleocene mammals of Europe
Paleogene France
Fossils of France
Paleogene Spain
Fossils of Spain
Tremp Formation
Fossil taxa described in 1878
Prehistoric placental genera